Herbie Kane (born 23 November 1998) is an English professional footballer who plays for Barnsley, as a midfielder.

Club career
Born in Bristol, Kane began his career with Bristol City before moving to Liverpool at the age of 15. In July 2018, he was one of 100 young players nominated alongside Liverpool teammates Trent Alexander-Arnold and Ben Woodburn, for the Golden Boy award.

He signed on loan for Doncaster Rovers in August 2018. He made his English Football League debut on 11 August 2018. In December 2018, he signed a new contract with Liverpool, and also extended his Doncaster loan until the end of the season.

He made his competitive debut for Liverpool on 25 September 2019 in an EFL Cup match against Milton Keynes Dons.

On 3 January 2020, Kane joined Hull City on loan until the end of the season. He scored his first goal for Hull in a 3–3 draw with Birmingham City on 27 June 2020.

On 16 October 2020, he moved to Barnsley for a transfer fee of £1.25 million, signing a four-year contract.

On 30 August 2021, Kane joined Oxford United on loan until the end of the season.

International career
Kane has represented England at under-17 level.

Playing style
Kane has been described by Liverpool as a "lively player in the middle of the park".

Career statistics

References

External links

1998 births
Footballers from Bristol
Living people
English footballers
England youth international footballers
Bristol City F.C. players
Liverpool F.C. players
Doncaster Rovers F.C. players
Hull City A.F.C. players
Barnsley F.C. players
Oxford United F.C. players
English Football League players
Association football midfielders